Margaret "Peg" Flory (born August 2, 1948) is a Republican politician who served in the Vermont Senate from 2011 until 2019, representing the Rutland District. From 1999 to 2010, she served in the Vermont House of Representatives, where she represented the Rutland-6 Representative District.

She did not seek reelection in 2018.

References

1948 births
Living people
Republican Party members of the Vermont House of Representatives
Republican Party Vermont state senators
Women state legislators in Vermont
21st-century American women